Shacky Timburwa (born 9 May 1992) is a Zimbabwean entrepreneur and speaker.

Early life
Shacky Timburwa was born in Mutare, Zimbabwe. He grew up in Dangamvura township of Mutare.

Career
Timburwa is the founder of Energy Plus, an energy company and Parvaim Gold Holdings a mining company. In 2019, he was listed among 100 Most Influential Young Leaders in Africa by Pan-African Youth Leadership. He was also recognised in the Zimbabwe's top 40 Most Influential Leaders of 2020 by Young Corporate Directors' Network of the Institute of Corporate Directors Zimbabwe in collaboration with Institute of Corporate Governance Zimbabwe as well as international bodies such as Professional Director Canada and Governance Solutions Canada.

In 2021, Shacky Timburwa was listed among the Forbes Africa 30 under 30 class of 2021. According to Forbes Africa, those who made the list are change makers for a new COVID-19 induced agenda for social change. He was also nominated to take part at the Pan African Youth Leadership Forum, World Energy Council's Future Energy Leaders Program. Timburwa was appointed to represent Zimbabwe at the Global Chamber of Business Leaders, Young Business Leaders’ Programme.

References

1992 births
Living people
Zimbabwean businesspeople